A Summer in St. Tropez or Un été à Saint-Tropez (original French title) is a 1983 French film directed by photographer David Hamilton.

Principal photography
The film was shot at and around David Hamilton's own house in Saint Tropez, which is 800 years old.

Summary
The film contains no dialogue at all, although the characters occasionally laugh and giggle. The soundtrack is the music of Benoit Wiedemann. Stills from the film can be seen in Hamilton's book The Dance. Some shots in the film are taken from his books Sisters and Dreams of a Young Girl.

Availability
This film is available on DVD in the UK.

Book
A book of images from the film, A Summer in St. Tropez, was released in 1983.

References

External links

1983 drama films
1983 films
1984 films
Films directed by David Hamilton
French coming-of-age drama films
1984 drama films
1980s coming-of-age drama films
1980s French films